The 1902–03 Syracuse Orangemen men's basketball team represented Syracuse University during the 1902–03 college men's basketball season. The team captain was Earl Twombley. Instead of a head coach, the team's operations was headed by guard and team manager Frank Bohr.

Schedule

|-

Source

Roster
Earl Rice
Arthur Brady
Earl Twombley
Frank Consedine
Clarence Houseknecht
Clinton Goodwin
Frank Bohr
Harley Crane
? Williams
Arthur Evans

References

External links
 OrangeHoops.com recap of 1902–03 season

Syracuse
Syracuse Orange men's basketball seasons
Syracuse Orange Basketball Team
Syracuse Orange Basketball Team